The 2020–21 Úrvalsdeild kvenna is the 64th season of the Úrvalsdeild kvenna, the top tier women's basketball league on Iceland. The season started on 23 September 2020. On 7 October, the Icelandic Basketball Association postponed the season for two weeks do to another Coronavirus outbreak in Iceland.  It concluded on 2 June 2021 with Valur winning their second title after beating Haukar 3–0 in the Úrvalsdeild finals.

Competition format
The participating teams first play a conventional round-robin schedule with every team playing each opponent twice "home" and twice "away" for a total of 28 games. The top four teams qualify for the championship playoffs whilst the bottom team will be relegated to 1. deild kvenna.

Teams

Managerial changes

Regular season

Note: Valur was awarded a 20-0 victory against Breiðablik due to the later using a player that was serving a 1 game suspension. Breiðablik originally won the game 71-67.

Playoffs
The playoffs are played between the four first qualified teams with a 1-1-1-1-1 format, playing seeded teams games 1, 3 and 5 at home.

Bracket

Updated to match(es) played on 21 May 2021. Source: KKÍ

Semifinals

|}

Final

|}

Notable occurrences
On 1 April, Snæfell's star player Gunnhildur Gunnarsdóttir announced her retirement from basketball.
On 6 May, it was announced that Haukar player Sigrún Björg Ólafsdóttir would be leaving the team and attend the University of Tennessee.
On 6 May, it was reported that Keflavík starter Þóranna Kika Hodge-Carr would attend Iona College and play for the Iona Gaels women's basketball team.
On 13 May, Hildur Björg Kjartansdóttir left KR and signed with Reykjavík rivals Valur.
On 15 May, KR's star Danielle Rodriguez announced that she was retiring from playing professionally to fully focus on her coaching career.
On 15 May, Fjölnir announced it had signed Lithuanian national team member Lina Pikčiūtė.
On 15 May, Embla Kristínardóttir signed with reigning Icelandic Cup champions Skallagrímur after playing for Fjölnir the previous season.
On 17 June, Skallagrímur signed Sanja Orozović from KR.
On 25 June, Haiden Palmer signed with Snæfell with whom she won the national championship in 2016.
On 9 July, Haukar signed Bríet Sif Hinriksdóttir and Elísabeth Ýr Ægisdóttir from Grindavík.
On 7 August, Valur signed Eydís Eva Þórisdóttir and former national team players Jóhanna Björk Sveinsdóttir and Auður Íris Ólafsdóttir.
On 19 August, Fjölnir signed Irish national team member Fiona O'Dwyer.
On 21 August, KR announced that it had signed Finnish national team member Annika Holopainen and American Taryn McCutcheon.
On 3 September, KR announced that former national team players Margrét Kara Sturludóttir and Unnur Tara Jónsdóttir had retired from basketball.
On 17 September, Fjölnir announced that it had signed Ariana Moorer to replace injured Areil Hearn. Moorer had previously played in the Úrvalsdeild during the 2016–17 season when she helped Keflavík win the national championship and the Icelandic Cup.
On 27 September, all players of Keflavík and KR where quarantined and their next games postponed after one of the players from their game on 23 September was diagnosed with COVID-19.
On 28 September, the Icelandic Basketball Association (KKÍ) ruled that Breiðablik would have to forfeit its unexpected win against defending champions Valur in the first game of the season and be fined 250.000 ISK for using a suspended player in the game. On 11 March 2020, Breiðablik's Fanney Lind Thomas was suspended one game by KKÍ's disciplinary court for two technical fouls and excessive complaining to a referee. Two days later the rest of the 2019–20 season was canceled due to the coronavirus pandemic in Iceland. Per KKÍ rules, Fanney would have to serve her suspension in the first game of the 2020–21 season.
On 5 October, KR fired head coach Francisco Garcia after only two games, both losses. In his place, the team hired Mike Denzel who had previously served as an assistant coach to Stew Johnson for the KR men's team, and Guðrún Arna Sigurðardóttir as his assistant coach. Until Denzel's arrival, Jóhannes Árnason was appointed as an interim coach.
On 7 October, the season was postponed for two weeks due to another outbreak of Covid-19 in Iceland.
On 2 January, Fjölnir announced it had released American Fiona O'Dwyer at her own request and signed Portuguese national team player Sara Djassi in her place.
On 24 February, Sóllilja Bjarnadóttir scored 28 points, including 17 points in a row, for Breiðablik in a victory against KR.
On 25 February, Icelandic national team member Sara Rún Hinriksdóttir signed with Haukar, rejoining with her twin sister Bríet Sif.
On 1 March, it was announced that Icelandic national team member Sigrún Björg Ólafsdóttir would join Fjölnir when her season with the University of Tennessee at Chattanooga would end.
On 11 March, Isabella Ósk Sigurðardóttir grabbed 28 rebounds while also scoring 21 points in a 93-76 victory against Snæfell. It was the most rebounds by an Icelandic player in the history of the Úrvalsdeild.
On 10 May, it was announced that Thelma Dís Ágústsdóttir would finish the season with Keflavík.

References

External links
Official Icelandic Basketball Federation website

Icelandic
Lea
Úrvalsdeild kvenna seasons (basketball)
Iceland Women